United States education case law